Kannan Vignesh (born 15 October 1993) is an Indian cricketer. He made his Twenty20 debut on 15 January 2021, for Puducherry in the 2020–21 Syed Mushtaq Ali Trophy. He made his List A debut on 27 February 2021, for Puducherry in the 2020–21 Vijay Hazare Trophy.

References

External links
 

1993 births
Living people
Indian cricketers
Pondicherry cricketers
Place of birth missing (living people)